Just My Type may refer to:
 Just My Type (book), a book about typography by Simon Garfield
 Just My Type (song), a 2018 song by The Vamps